Lee Spring is an unincorporated community in Smith County, located in the U.S. state of Texas.

Notes

Unincorporated communities in Smith County, Texas
Unincorporated communities in Texas